Harold McCowat (30 April 1882 – 20 March 1956) was a Scotland international rugby union player.

Rugby Union career

Amateur career

He played for Glasgow Academicals.

He was in the side that won the Scottish Unofficial Championship of 1903–04 season; and 1904–5 season; and shared the 1902–03 season with Edinburgh University.

Provincial career

He played for Glasgow District in 1904 inter-city match. McCowat was due to play for the Provinces against the Cities District in 1905, but he was promoted to the Cities District side.

International career

He was capped for Scotland only the once, in 1905. This was in the 1905 Five Nations Championship match against Ireland.

McCowat was noted for his speed. The London Evening Standard of 9 February 1905 noting in the preview to the Ireland match:
McCowat vies with Burt-Marshall of Fettes, for the honour of the fastest wing three in Scotland. He is a splendid runner, and possesses the splendid faculty of always going straight for the line.

Other sports

In the West of Scotland Harriers Athletics Event of 1903 at Celtic Park, McCowat representing Glasgow Academicals ran the 120 yard hurdles in the Open event. It was a handicap race and McCowat gave the other competitors as much as a 16 yards and 1 foot advantage. His main rival Murray was giving an advantage of 10 yards and 2 feet. It was reported that McCowat and Murray were neck and neck 4 hurdles from home, McCowat having already made up the difference, but only secured the victory on the line by a few inches.

References

1882 births
1956 deaths
Scottish rugby union players
Scotland international rugby union players
Cities District players
Glasgow District (rugby union) players
Glasgow Academicals rugby union players
Rugby union players from Durban
Rugby union wings
Emigrants from the Colony of Natal to the United Kingdom